Charlemagne is a city in the Canadian province of Quebec, Canada on the north shore of the Rivière des Prairies,  northeast of Montreal's downtown core. In 2021, the population was 6,302.

It is the birthplace of singer Celine Dion. The town council named one of its main streets after her without the recognition of a Quebec commission. Additionally, the town erected a sculpture on Dion's behalf. Charlemagne is also the birthplace of politician Camille Laurin.

Demographics 

See also
 List of cities in Quebec

References

Cities and towns in Quebec
Incorporated places in Lanaudière
Greater Montreal